Golos (Голос), a word for "voice" in various Slavic languages, may refer to:

Periodicals
 Golos (newspaper), a Russian newspaper, published in Saint Petersburg in 1863-1885
 Golos Prikazchika, a former weekly newspaper published in St. Petersburg
 Golos Respubliki, a Kazakhstani newspaper
 Golos Sotsial-Demokrata, a former Russian-language publication, issued by a section of exiled Mensheviks
 Golos Truda, an anarcho-syndicalist periodical published in New York, St. Petersburg and Moscow in the 1910s and 1920s

Film and television
 Golos (film), a Russian 1982 psychological drama
 Golos (TV series), Russian music talent television show, part of the international Voice franchise

Other

 Golos (election monitor), a coalition of non-governmental groups monitoring for election violations and government responsiveness to citizen requests in Russia
 Jacob Golos (1889–1943), Ukrainian-born Bolshevik revolutionary and Soviet secret police operative in the USSR, founder of Golos spy ring with Gaik Ovakimian as head in U.S.
 Holos (political party), sometimes romanized as Golos, a pro-European political party in Ukraine